Prue Yai is a sub-district of Khukhan District, Sisaket Province. Its name means "Great Forest" because in the past, this area was the great forest before.

History
1907 Prue Yai was a sub-district of Huai Nuea District (Khukhan District), Khukhan Provine (Sisaket Province)
1986 Na Lawia Village and Sawai Pheng Village were divided from Prue Yai in order to establish Nikhom Phatthana Sub-district and Khok Tan Sub-district was divided from Prue Yai.
1988 Takhian Ram Sub-district was divided from Prue Yai
1990 Dong Rak Sub-district was divided from Khok Tan

Administration
The sub-district is divided into 20 villages (Muban), arranging by village number (Mu) as follows:
Mu 1 Prue Yai
Mu 2 Lak 
Mu 3 Ta Bo 
Mu 4 Makham
Mu 5 Prue Khan Tawan-ok
Mu 6 Non Sombun
Mu 7 Prue Khan Tawantok
Mu 8 Pho Sawang
Mu 9 Khlong Lamchiak
Mu 10 Ket Na Kho
Mu 11 Noen Saeng
Mu 12 Saen Suk
Mu 13 Na Charia
Mu 14 Prue Khan Tai
Mu 15 Bang Krawan
Mu 16 Nong Asen
Mu 17 Thung Chai
Mu 18 Noen Seri
Mu 19 Nong Sim
Mu 20 Na Kho

Public health
Prue Yai Health Promoting Hospital
Prue Khan Health Promoting Hospital
Tabtim Siam 06 Health Promoting Hospital

Education
Primary
Prue Khan School
Makham School
Lak School
Non Sombun School
Tabtim Siam 06 School
Primary and middle
Prue Yai School
Middle and High
Prue Yai Witthayabanlang School

Religion
People are mostly Theravada Buddhists, there are seven temples in the sub-district
Maha Nikaya
Prue Khan Temple (The temple of Khukhan district monk dean)
Prue Yai Temple (The temple of Phu Sing district monk dean)
Ta Bo Ket Mongkhon Temple
Pho Sawang Temple
Non Sombun Temple
Dhammayuttika Nikaya
Sa Phong Cave Temple
Pa Mamuang Temple without royal bound Buddhist stone (leave)

Tourist attractions
Tabtim Siam 06 Royal Project
Chulabhorn Wildlife Breeding Center
Sa Phong Cave Temple
Morakot Cliff

References

Populated places in Sisaket province